This is a list of diplomatic missions of the Sahrawi Arab Democratic Republic (SADR). The Sahrawi Arab Democratic Republic's government in exile, led by the Polisario Front and headquartered at Camp Rabouni, Algeria, and has a small diplomatic network overseas. Due to Morocco's claim of sovereignty over the Western Sahara, which it calls the Southern Provinces, the SADR does not enjoy wide recognition. Most of the embassies of the SADR are in Africa and Latin America. Some embassies have multiple accreditation. In addition, SADR (Polisario Front) maintains an extensive network of representatives in countries that do not recognise the SADR as a sovereign state.

Africa

Algiers (Embassy)
Oran (Consulate)

Luanda (Embassy, Embassy for Namibia)

Gaborone (Embassy)

Addis Ababa (Embassy)

Accra (Embassy)

Nairobi (Embassy)

Tripoli (General Delegation)

Maputo (Embassy)

Abuja (Embassy)

Pretoria (Embassy, Embassy for Lesotho)

Dar-es-Salaam (Embassy, Embassy for Mauritius)

 Kampala (Embassy, Embassy for Rwanda)

Harare (Embassy)

Americas

Buenos Aires (Mission)

Brasilia (Mission)

Santiago de Chile (Mission)

Bogotá (Mission)

Havana (Embassy)

Quito (Embassy)

Port-au-Prince (Mission)

Mexico City (Embassy)

Managua (Embassy, Embassy for Belize)

Panama City (Embassy)

Lima (Mission)

Montevideo (Embassy) 

Caracas (Embassy)

Asia

Dili (Embassy, Embassy for Vanuatu)
	
New Delhi (Representation Office for India, Embassy for Laos)

Jakarta (Representation Office)

Tokyo (Representation Office)

Damascus (General Delegation)

Europe
	
Vienna (Representation Office)

Brussels (Representation Office)

Copenhagen (Representation Office)

Helsinki (Representation Office)

Bagnolet (Paris) (Representation Office)	
	
Berlin (Representation Office)
Bremen (Representation Office)

Athens (Representation Office)

Budapest (Representation Office)	
	
Dublin (Representation Office)

Rome (Representation Office)
Sesto Fiorentino (Representation Office)

The Hague (Representation Office)	
	
Oslo (Representation Office)

Warsaw (Representation Office)

Lisbon (Representation Office)

Bucharest (Representation Office)

Moscow (Representation Office)

Belgrade (Representation Office)	
	
Madrid (Representation Office)
Barcelona (Representation Office)
	
Stockholm (Representation Office)	
	
Geneva (Representation Office)	

London (Representation Office)

Oceania

Glebe (Sydney) (Representation Office)

Multilateral organisations
Addis Ababa (Permanent Mission to the African Union)
Brussels (SADR Office to the European Union)
Geneva (SADR Office to the United Nations)
New York City (SADR Office to the United Nations)

See also
Foreign relations of the Sahrawi Arab Democratic Republic
List of diplomatic missions to the Sahrawi Arab Democratic Republic

Notes

External links
Sahrawi embassies & delegations in the world
Sahrawi embassy in Algeria 
Sahrawi embassy in Ethiopia and to the African Union
Sahrawi embassy in Mexico 
Sahrawi embassy in Panama 
Sahrawi embassy in Uruguay  
Sahrawi embassy in Venezuela 
Sahrawi embassy in Zimbabwe

References

Foreign relations of the Sahrawi Arab Democratic Republic
Sahrawi Arab Democratic Republic
Western Sahara-related lists
Lists of organizations based in Western Sahara
Diplomatic missions